Alberto Lois (May 6, 1956 – March 12, 2019), was a Major League Baseball player. Lois played for the Pittsburgh Pirates in 1978 and 1979. He was used primarily as a pinch runner, but was also an outfielder.

On January 5, 1980, Lois sustained serious injuries in a vehicular accident in the Dominican Republic when the truck he was driving collided with a train that was parked, unlit, in the middle of a grade crossing.  Six of the nine people in the truck were killed. Lois was thrown from the vehicle; he was unconscious for six days, and damage to his right eye ended his career in professional baseball.

Personal life
Lois was of Haitian descent. He died at his home on March 12, 2019.

References

External links

1956 births
2019 deaths
Buffalo Bisons (minor league) players
Charleston Charlies players
Charleston Pirates players
Columbus Clippers players
Dominican Republic expatriate baseball players in the United States
Dominican Republic people of Haitian descent
Afro-Dominican (Dominican Republic)
Gulf Coast Pirates players
Major League Baseball outfielders
Major League Baseball players from the Dominican Republic
Portland Beavers players
People from Hato Mayor del Rey
Pittsburgh Pirates players
Salem Pirates players
Shreveport Captains players